Atypical tuberous myxedema, also known as Jadassohn–Dosseker syndrome, is thought to represent a pure nodular variant of lichen myxedematosus.

See also
 Skin lesion
 List of cutaneous conditions

References

Mucinoses